Kirill Lemeshkevich (born 12 May 1986) is a Belarusian rower. He competed in the men's quadruple sculls event at the 2008 Summer Olympics.

References

External links
 

1986 births
Living people
Belarusian male rowers
Olympic rowers of Belarus
Rowers at the 2008 Summer Olympics
People from Polotsk
Sportspeople from Vitebsk Region